The 2004 Le Mans Endurance Series was the inaugural season of ACO's Le Mans Endurance Series.  It is a series for Le Mans prototype and Grand Touring style cars broken into 4 classes: LMP1, LMP2, GTS, and GT. It began on 9 May 2004 and ended on 13 November 2004 after 4 rounds.

This season was preceded by the 1000km of Le Mans held in 2003 as a development race for the creation of the LMES.

Schedule

Entry list

Season results
Overall winner in bold.

Teams Championships
Points are awarded to the top 8 finishers in the order of 10-8-6-5-4-3-2-1.  Teams with multiple entries do not have their cars combined, each entry number is scored separately in the championship.  Cars failing to complete 70% of the winner's distance are not awarded points.

LMP1 Standings

LMP2 Standings

GTS Standings

† - Half points were awarded due to a lack of competitors.

GT Standings

External links
 2004 LMES season review

 
European Le Mans Series seasons
Le Mans Series
Le Mans Series